Palash Nandy (born 17 July 1952) is a retired Indian cricketer. He was a right-handed batsman and right-arm offbreak bowler. He represented Bengal in first-class cricket and limited overs cricket matches. He had also captained the Bengal team during his playing days and had coached the same team after his retirement. He has been awarded the Life Time Achievement Award By CAB(Cricket Association Of Bengal).

References

Indian cricketers
Bengal cricketers
1952 births
Living people